Spinturnix americana is a species of mite that parasitizes bat wings. It was described as a new species in 1902 by American entomologist Nathan Banks. Banks initially placed it in the now-defunct genus Pteroptus.
The holotype had been collected from a bat in a cave in Indiana.
Species that it affects include the little brown bat, northern long-eared bat, and riparian myotis.
It has been documented affecting bats in Indiana and Pennsylvania in the United States, Nova Scotia in Canada, and Mato Grosso in Brazil.

References

Animals described in 1902
Taxa named by Nathan Banks
Parasites of bats
Mesostigmata